Narushima Station is the name of multiple train stations in Japan.

 Narushima Station (Gunma) - (成島駅) in Gunma Prefecture
 Narushima Station (Yamagata) - (成島駅) in Yamagata Prefecture